Cuppa Coffee Studios (formerly known as Cuppa Coffee Animation) is a Canadian production company headquartered in Toronto, Ontario. Cuppa Coffee was founded by Adam Shaheen in 1992. It specializes in both stop-motion animation and 2D animation, winning over 150 international awards. Cuppa Coffee is currently developing live-action content through Cuppa Coffee USA.

History
By late 1992, Adam Shaheen had worked on several editorial assignments, book jackets and CD covers, but he wanted to create a unique animation style mixing photographic, collage and illustration techniques. In December, he founded Cuppa Coffee Animation with Bruce Alcock, and Steve Hillman joined the company shortly after. Cuppa Coffee's first projects were network IDs and show opens for MuchMusic and a commercial for Fruity Pebbles. In March 1993, Cuppa Coffee was featured on Citytv's MediaTelevision program; the interview expanded a campaign for Molson's Black Ice which exhibited their unique mixed-media animation. Bruce Alcock moved to Chicago in 1995 to start Tricky Pictures, Backyard Productions' animation subsidiary. In February 1996, Cuppa Coffee began producing live-action, starting with three spots for Molson Ultra. In 1997, Cuppa Coffee launched Sargent York, a short-lived arm of the company that would work on longer-form content like "The Adventures of Sam Digital in the 21st Century", an award-winning short film for Nickelodeon. In the late 1990s, Cuppa Coffee produced the HBO Family series Crashbox and other shorter projects for the network, the CBS Christmas special Snowden's Christmas, and pilots for Nickelodeon and Cartoon Network.

In 2001, Cuppa Coffee Animation started development on three series for children: Cinema Sue, Ted's Bed and Gordon Giraffe. The following year, Broadway Video Enterprises agreed to distribute the three series, but none of them went into production. In 2004, Cuppa Coffee launched Decaf Distribution as it started producing its own content. In 2005, the short series Bruno aired on Noggin and international Nickelodeon channels, and AWOL Animation agreed to distribute the short series Tigga and Togga and Bruno and the Banana Bunch, a long-form series based on the Bruno interstitials. Cuppa Coffee was also going to co-produce Captain Mack with Kickback Media, but the completed series was produced by Fireback Entertainment instead.

In September 2009, Gordon Ramsay signed a prime time animation deal with Cuppa Coffee Studios, who began working on the series Gordon Ramsay, At Your Service, which was never completed. In 2010, Cuppa Coffee Studios added 30 stages and 30,000 square feet to its Toronto studios. Cuppa Coffee launched Saucer Sound that year and Lemon Squeezy Interactive in 2011. After Cuppa Coffee developed other animated projects throughout the 2010s that never went into production, including a show based on Polybank Designs' Pets Rock licensing brand in 2017. The studio opened Cuppa Coffee USA in 2018 and is developing live action dramas.

List of productions by Cuppa Coffee Studios

Crashbox (1999–2000) (52x30 episodes)
Little People (1999–2005) (co-production with Egmont Imagination, Fisher-Price and Wreckless Abandon Studios)
Snowden's Christmas (1999)
The Cartoon Cartoon Show ("Trevor!") (2000)
Henry's World (2002–2005) (co-production with Family Channel, Alliance Atlantis and TV-Loonland AG)
JoJo's Circus (2003–2007) (co-production with Walt Disney Television Animation and Cartoon Pizza for Playhouse Disney)
The Wrong Coast (2004) (26x11 episodes) (co-production with Curious Pictures)
Bruno (2005) (50x1 episodes)
A Very Barry Christmas (2005)
Celebrity Deathmatch (2006–2007)
Feeling Good with JoJo (2006–2008) (co-production with Walt Disney Television Animation and Cartoon Pizza for Playhouse Disney)
Starveillance (2007)
Bruno and the Banana Bunch (2007)
Rick & Steve: The Happiest Gay Couple in All the World (2007–2009)
Life's a Zoo (2008) (20x22 episodes)
A Miser Brothers' Christmas (2008)
Nerdland (2009) (pilot)
Glenn Martin, DDS (2009–2011) (40x22 episodes)
Ugly Americans (2010–2012)
The Devil's Due (2011) (short film)
Archetype Me (2013) (short film)
Dodie in Oz (2013) (short film)
Fordtacular Spectacular! (2013) (short film)
Trump Unhinged (2016) (web shorts)

Other work

References

Notes

External links 
 Cuppa Coffee Studio website

Entertainment companies established in 1992
Mass media companies established in 1992
Canadian animation studios
Television production companies of Canada
Companies based in Toronto
1992 establishments in Ontario